Romeyleh-ye Olya (also Romanized as Romeyleh-ye ‘Olyā; also known as Ramīleh, Romeyleh, Romeyleh-ye Bālā, and Rumailah) is a village in Azadeh Rural District, Moshrageh District, Ramshir County, Khuzestan Province, Iran. At the 2006 census, its population was 1,191, in 211 families.

References 

Populated places in Ramshir County